Ökmen is a surname of Turkish origin. Notable people with the surname are as follows:

Mümtaz Ökmen (1895–1961), Turkish lawyer and politician
Nedim Ökmen (1908–1967), Turkish economist and politician

Surnames of Turkish origin